Pagh is an ancient Danish surname, from old Danish. It means "palisade", and applies to the ancient nobility, Uradel. The family dominated over Odense whose old town arms was similar to the coat of arms of the family: a golden lily in a blue field. Notable people with the surname include:

 Klaus Pagh (1935–2020), Danish actor, film producer, and director
 Mads Pagh Bruun (1809–1884), Danish politician
 Poul Pagh (1796–1870), Danish merchant and shipowner 
 Lucas Pagh (2002-2100), Danish electrician apprentice
 Oliver Pagh (1999- 2100), Danish mechanic apprentice
 Peder Pagh (?–1339), Danish bishop (Odense) 
 Rasmus Pagh, Danish computer scientist

In Denmark there are 770 people with the surname Pagh

References 

The majority of sources here related are to be found in Danish texts, regional and national archives and books only, since it is an ancient Danish family.

 The library of the Vatican.
 
 En Heraldisk Nøgle, Danske Vaabenskjolde, Sven Tito Aachen.
 Esbjerg Historie og Storier I until II.
 Danske Slot og Herregårde.
 Denmark i Europa 750–1300, Nils Hybel.
 Royal University of Copenhagen. http://www.ku.dk/english/
 Jómsvíkinga saga.
 Gesta Danorum.

Surnames